Yamaico Navarro Pérez (born October 31, 1987) is a Dominican professional baseball infielder who is a free agent. He has played in Major League Baseball for the Boston Red Sox, Kansas City Royals, Pittsburgh Pirates, and Baltimore Orioles.

Career

Boston Red Sox
Navarro was born in San Pedro de Macorís and signed by scout Pablo Lantigua. He began his professional career in 2006, with the DSL Red Sox. He hit .279 in 53 games. The following year, he played for the Lowell Spinners, hitting .289 in 62 games. In 2008, Navarro played for the Greenville Drive (83 games) and Lancaster JetHawks (42 games), hitting a combined .304 with 11 home runs in 125 games. In 2009, he played for the Spinners (five games), Salem Red Sox (23 games) and Portland Sea Dogs (39 games), hitting a combined .240 in 67 games. Navarro hit .275 with 11 home runs for the Sea Dogs (88 games) and Pawtucket Red Sox (16 games) prior to his August 20, 2010, call-up.

Navarro was added to the Red Sox 40 man roster and called up on August 20, 2010, when Dustin Pedroia went on the disabled list. Navarro made his Major League debut against the Toronto Blue Jays that same day.

On July 2, 2011, Navarro hit his first career home run off Houston Astros pitcher J. A. Happ.

Kansas City Royals
On July 30, 2011, Navarro was traded to the Kansas City Royals along with minor league pitcher Kendal Volz for infielder Mike Avilés.

On August 4, 2011, Navarro picked up his first RBI in a Kansas City Royals uniform, going 1-for-4 at the plate with a walk and 3 RBIs in a 9–4 victory over the Baltimore Orioles.

The next day, Navarro was optioned to the Omaha Storm Chasers to allow room for Johnny Giavotella.

Pittsburgh Pirates
Navarro was traded to the Pittsburgh Pirates following the 2011 season in exchange for Brooks Pounders and Diego Goris. On July 4, 2012, Navarro was arrested for driving under the influence in Indianapolis. Navarro was released after spending one night in jail. On August 16, 2012, Navarro was called up after Neil Walker was injured during a game against the Dodgers.

Baltimore Orioles
On November 30, 2012, Navarro was traded to the Baltimore Orioles for Jhondaniel Medina. He was designated for assignment on June 18, 2013.

Samsung Lions
Navarro signed a minor league deal with the New York Yankees on November 19, 2013. The Yankees released Navarro so that he could sign with the Samsung Lions of the Korea Baseball Organization.

In 2014, his first KBO season, Navarro batted .308 and smacked 31 home runs (fifth in the league) with 98 RBI (ninth) and 25 stolen bases (eleventh), hitting leadoff in the order and playing second base. Navarro led the Lions to their fourth consecutive Korean Series title, tying Tyrone Woods' single Korean Series-record with four home runs, and his performance earned him the Korean Series Most Valuable Player Award. His 2015 season was even more impressive, as Navarro hit .287 with 48 home runs (2nd in the league) and 137 RBI (third). He was a 2015 KBO All-Star and was given a KBO Golden Glove Award in the outfielder category.

Chiba Lotte Marines 
Navarro signed a free agent contract with the Chiba Lotte Marines of Nippon Professional Baseball on January 13, 2016.

Sultanes de Monterrey 
On April 3, 2019, Navarro signed with the Sultanes de Monterrey of the Mexican League for the 2019 season. He was a LMB All-Star for the 2019 season. Navarro did not play in a game in 2020 due to the cancellation of the Mexican League season because of the COVID-19 pandemic.

On February 20, 2021, Navarro signed with the Fubon Guardians of the Chinese Professional Baseball League. However, the league did not allow the contract to take effect due to his criminal record.

On May 5, 2021, Navarro was released by the Sultanes so that he could represent the Dominican Republic at the Americas Qualifying Event for the 2020 Summer Olympics. However, he did not end up competing in the event. On June 30, 2021, Navarro re-signed with the Sultanes for the remainder of the 2021 season. He became a free agent following the season.

Personal life
On February 21, 2016, Navarro was arrested in Okinawa, Japan for concealing a bullet in his luggage. The bullet was discovered in Navarro's carry on bag during a security check for a domestic flight at Okinawa's airport. Possessing the bullet was a violation of Japan's firearms law. Navarro told police the bullet was from his home in the Dominican Republic but that he was not aware it was in his bag.

References

External links

Career statistics and player information from Korea Baseball Organization

1987 births
Living people
Baltimore Orioles players
Boston Red Sox players
Chiba Lotte Marines players
Dominican Summer League Red Sox players
Dominican Republic expatriate baseball players in Japan
Dominican Republic expatriate baseball players in Mexico
Dominican Republic expatriate baseball players in South Korea
Dominican Republic expatriate baseball players in the United States
Greenville Drive players
Indianapolis Indians players
Kansas City Royals players
KBO League third basemen
Korean Series MVPs
Lancaster JetHawks players

Lowell Spinners players
Major League Baseball players from the Dominican Republic
Major League Baseball shortstops
Nippon Professional Baseball infielders
Norfolk Tides players
Omaha Storm Chasers players
Pawtucket Red Sox players
Sportspeople from San Pedro de Macorís
Pittsburgh Pirates players
Portland Sea Dogs players
Salem Red Sox players
Samsung Lions players
Sultanes de Monterrey players
Tigres del Licey players
North Shore Honu players
Toros del Este players